Linda Smith is an American singer-songwriter, multi-instrumentalist, and home recording artist who began self-releasing cassette albums in the late 1980s. Beginning in the 1990s, some of her recordings were released in vinyl and CD form on indie labels such as Slumberland Records and Harriet Records. In 2021, the Captured Tracks label reissued a selection of her recordings on an album called Till Another Time: 1988–1996. Paste Magazine described the release as a "hidden treasure of America’s pop underground."

In the 1980s, prior to her solo career, Smith was in a New York City band called the Woods. In the 1990s, she was a member of the Silly Pillows, appearing as a vocalist on one album with the band. Other bands that included Smith were the Window Shoppers and Yours Truly.

Smith is a longtime resident of Baltimore.

Discography
The Space Between the Buildings (MC) – Preference – 1987
Do You Know the Way...? (MC) – Preference – 1988
"Gorgeous Weather" (7") – Harriet – 1990
Put It in Writing (MC) – Preference – 1991
"Till Another Time" (7") – Slumberland – 1993
Remember Your Heart (EP) – Hoppel di Hoy – 1993
Nothing Else Matters (CD) – Feel Good All Over – 1995
I So Liked Spring (MC) – Shrimper – 1996
Preference: Selected Songs, 1987–1991 (CD) – Harriet – 1997
Emily's House (CD) – Preference – 2001
Something New! (CD) – Preference – 2001
All the Stars That Never Were (MC) – Juniper Tree Songs – 2014
Till Another Time: 1988–1996 (CD) – Captured Tracks – 2021
Untitled 1–10 Plus 1 (LP) – Almost Halloween Time – 2021

References

Living people
Musicians from Baltimore
Year of birth missing (living people)
Cassette culture 1970s–1990s